"Behind the Cow" is a song by German band Scooter featuring American rapper Fatman Scoop. Premiered at The Dome 40 in Düsseldorf on 1 December 2006, it was released on 19 January 2007 as the lead single from Scooter's twelfth studio album The Ultimate Aural Orgasm. Jeff "Mantas" Dunn plays guitar on the track.

Track listing
CD single & Download
"Behind the Cow" [Radio Version](3:36)
"Behind the Cow" [Extended Version] (6:33)
"Behind the Cow" [Spencer & Hill Bigroom Mix] (6:32)
"Behind the Cow" [Spencer & Hill Dub Radio Edit] (2:54)
"Taj Mahal" (3:27)

12"
"Behind the Cow" [Extended Version] (6:22)
"Behind the Cow" [Spencer & Hill Bigroom Mix] (6:32)
"Behind the Cow" [Spencer & Hill Dub Mix] (5:57)

Music video
The video was filmed in India, where the band caused controversy by painting a cow, an animal considered holy in India.

Samples
"Behind the Cow" samples music and lyrics from the KLF songs "What Time Is Love? (Live at Trancentral)" and "America: What Time Is Love?", "(Don't Fear) The Reaper" by Blue Öyster Cult and "Black Celebration" by Depeche Mode. It also features vocals from the song "Yeh Kali Kali", from the Indian film Baazigar.

Charts

External links
Official Scooter site

References

Scooter (band) songs
2007 singles
Fatman Scoop songs
Songs written by H.P. Baxxter
Songs written by Rick J. Jordan
2007 songs
Songs written by Michael Simon (DJ)
Songs written by Jens Thele
Songs written by Fatman Scoop